Zeković is a Serbo-Croatian surname. It may refer to:

Miljan Zeković (1925–1993), Yugoslav footballer
Arnela Zeković (born 1993), Serbian model
Dragan Zeković (born 1987), Montenegrin basketballer

Serbian surnames